Anthony Gordon may refer to:

Tony Gordon (active 2007–2010), fictional character in British soap opera Coronation Street
Anthony Gordon (police officer) (  1976–2005), Canadian policeman, victim in the Mayerthorpe tragedy
Tony Gordon (rugby) (  1948–2012), New Zealand rugby footballer and coach
Anthony Gordon (footballer) (born 2001), English footballer with Newcastle United
Anthony Gordon (American football) (born 1997), American football quarterback